"Warning" is a song recorded by American country music singer Morgan Wallen. It was from his second studio album Dangerous: The Double Album. The song was co-wrote by Ashley Gorley, Ernest K. Smith and Ryan Vojtesak, and produced by Joey Moi.

Background
Wallen first teased "Warning" on May 1, 2020, with an Instagram post that featured an acoustic performance of just him and his guitar singing about how various things throughout his night "shoulda come with a warning" to prevent him from further heartbreak, and asked his fans if it should be on his second album.

Charts

Weekly charts

Year-end charts

Certifications

References

2021 songs
Morgan Wallen songs
Songs written by Ashley Gorley
Song recordings produced by Joey Moi
Songs written by Ernest (musician)